The Turkmenistan national U-23 football team represents Turkmenistan in international U-23 football competitions. It is controlled by the Football Association of Turkmenistan and is a member of the Asian Football Confederation.  The side has never qualified for the Olympic Games.

Asian Games

Since 2002, football at the Asian Games changes into Under-23 tournament.

AFC U-23 Championship

Recent fixtures

2021

2022

Current squad 
The following players were called-up for the 2022 AFC U-23 Asian Cup, held in June 2022.

Coaches

Previous squads 

Asian Games squads
Football at the 2010 Asian Games squads – Turkmenistan

Asian Cup squads
2022 AFC U-23 Asian Cup squads – Turkmenistan

References

Asian national under-23 association football teams
U23